The 163rd Massachusetts General Court, consisting of the Massachusetts Senate and the Massachusetts House of Representatives, met in 1963 and 1964 during the governorship of Endicott Peabody. John E. Powers served as president of the Senate and John F. Thompson served as speaker of the House.

On May 9, 1964, a special grand jury indicted House speaker Thompson on 29 counts of bribery. On June 16, 1964, the General Court passed the bill establishing the University of Massachusetts Boston co-sponsored by Senate Majority Leader Maurice A. Donahue, Senator George V. Kenneally Jr., and House Majority Whip Robert H. Quinn along with a $200,000 appropriation.

Senators

Representatives

See also
 88th United States Congress
 List of Massachusetts General Courts

References

Further reading

External links
 
 
 
 
  (1964-1994)

Political history of Massachusetts
Massachusetts legislative sessions
massachusetts
1963 in Massachusetts
massachusetts
1964 in Massachusetts